Francisco Alcaraz may refer to:
Francisco Alcaraz (footballer) (born 1960), Paraguayan footballer
Francisco Alcaraz (umpire) (1920–1996), Mexican League baseball umpire
Francisco José Alcaraz (born 1968), Spanish politician and activist

See also 
 Alcaraz (surname)